Raymond E. Carey (born June 1, 1973) is an American former competition swimmer.  

Carey attended Stanford University, where he swam for the Stanford Cardinal swimming and diving team in National Collegiate Athletic Association (NCAA) and Pacific-10 Conference competition from 1992 to 1995.  Stanford won three consecutive NCAA national team championships while Carey was a Cardinal swimmer, and he won the individual NCAA national championship in the 200-yard butterfly with a time of 1:44.01 in 1993.  He graduated from Stanford with a bachelor's degree in 1995, and a master's degree in 1996.

Carey represented the United States at the 1996 Summer Olympics in Atlanta, Georgia.  He competed in the preliminary heats of the men's 200-meter butterfly event, and posted a time of 2:01.10, finishing twenty-first overall.

See also
 List of Stanford University people

References

1973 births
Living people
American male butterfly swimmers
Olympic swimmers of the United States
Stanford Cardinal men's swimmers
Swimmers at the 1996 Summer Olympics
Universiade medalists in swimming
Universiade gold medalists for the United States
Medalists at the 1991 Summer Universiade